Kiwitahi is a rural community in the Matamata-Piako District and Waikato region of New Zealand's North Island, located directly south of Morrinsville.

The community has a school and a local hall that accommodates up to 120 people.

History

Kiwitahi was occupied by Māori before being converted into farmland by European settlers from the 1870s.

William Chepmell established a 690-acre farm at Kiwitahi in 1871, which he continued operating through the depression of the 1880s and 1890s without having to sell or subdivide. He led a campaign for a road between Morrinsville and Thames and became a politician, serving on the Piako Council and Waitoa Road Board at various times between 1887 and 1914. The remoteness of Kiwitahi meant he rode an estimated 56,000 km to attend council and road board meetings.

In 1985, Chepmell helped fund the construction of an Anglican church. In 1900, he pushed for a school to be built in Kiwitahi despite his own reservations about public education. The school eventually opened thirteen years later.

By 1902 Cyclopedia of New Zealand described Kiwitahi as having "fine grazing farms" and a railway station.

New Zealand Co-operative Dairy Company Ltd had a cheese factory near the railway station, from 1919, until it burnt down on 9 October 1937, by which time it was producing casein.

In 1923 a poll was held to decide on funding road metalling and there were about 40 or 50 settlers.

Chepmell died in 1930. His farm was brought by the Government after World War II, and subdivided for settling returned servicemen back to the land.

Railway station 

In 1898 there was a petition for a goods shed and, in 1905, there was a record that a new goods shed had been built at Waitakere and the old one re-erected at Kiwitahi. There was a shed opposite the shelter after the station closed. Sheep yards were added between 1887 and 1911. In 1912 it was noted that a tablet porter required. In the 1930s the porter established a garden at the station. In 1937 the stockyards were extended and electric lights replaced the oil lamps. In 1918 the Returned Services Association got a Post Office opened at the station. It closed in 1947. There was also a store and petrol pump next to the station from 1923 to 1934.

Kiwitahi station closed to passengers on 12 November 1968 and to goods on 17 July 1972. There is now only a single track through the station site. There is a passing loop at Kereone,  to the south.

Ecology

A water quality, water flow and ecology monitoring station is located at on the Piako River at Kiwitahi. It is open with a one-metre fenced off buffer on either side of the stream and no riparian planting. Macrophytes choke the softy, silty riverbed during the summer, but are often removed during the winter floods.

Education

The school was established in 1913 and held Golden Jubilee celebrations in 1963.

References

Matamata-Piako District
Populated places in Waikato